Bodedern is a village and community in the west of Anglesey, Wales.
At the 2001 census, it had a population of 1,074, decreasing slightly to 1,051 at the 2011 census. The community includes the settlements of Llanllibio and Pen-llyn.

Location

About  to the south, beyond the A55 road lie the villages of Caergeiliog and Llanfihangel yn Nhowyn. The Valley Wetlands, an area of lakes and marshes and a RSPB bird sanctuary, lie between these two villages.

Education
The village has a bilingual primary school, Ysgol Gynradd Bodedern, and a secondary school, Ysgol Uwchradd Bodedern.

Sport
The village's football team, Bodedern Athletic F.C. play in the Welsh Alliance League. Bodedern was the site of the National Eisteddfod of Wales in 2017. It hosted several matches during the 2019 Inter Games Football Tournament.

Listed buildings
The parish church (St Edern's Church, Bodedern) dates from the 14th century and is a Grade II* listed building, being listed because it is considered a good example of a late medieval church with some fine interior fittings.

Presaddfed Hall is a small grade II* listed country house which stands amongst woodlands to the north-east of the village at the southern tip of Llyn Llywenan. The main block was built in 1686 and is joined to an earlier block by a later block built in 1875. A walled garden lies to the east of the house. The manor was once the seat of the Lewis family, William Lewis (born 1526) is an example who served as High Sheriff of Anglesey, and was a politician holding public offices in parliament. The hall is now a country hotel.

Presaddfed Burial Chamber is a pair of Neolithic chamber tombs located a short distance northwest of Bodedern near the southern end of Llyn Llywenan.

The other scheduled monument within the community is an early Christian cemetery, east of the village, which is thought to be the location of an ancient chapel, Eglwys Ederyn. The site, at which 114 burials were recorded, was excavated in 1971, revealing several stone cists, and a stone inscribed with the word 'Ercagni', now kept in Bodedern Church.

Notable people 

 William Roberts (1830–1899) a British physician whose work contributed to the discovery of penicillin
 Dion Donohue (born 1993), footballer, with over 250 club caps

References

External links

 A Vision of Britain Through Time
 British Listed Buildings
 Genuki
 Geograph
 Office for National Statistics